Sulfolobus tokodaii is a thermophilic archaeon. It is acidophilic and obligately aerobic. The type strain is 7 (JCM 10545). Its genome has been sequenced.

References

Further reading

External links

LPSN
Type strain of Sulfolobus tokodaii at BacDive -  the Bacterial Diversity Metadatabase

Thermoproteota
Archaea described in 2002